Speck is a surname, primarily of German origin. Notable people with the surname include:

 Christa Speck (born 1942), German model and actress
 Cliff Speck (born 1956), American baseball player
 Dutch Speck (1886–1952), American football player
 Frank Speck (1881–1950), American anthropologist
 Fred Speck (1947–2011), Canadian ice hockey player
 Hermann Ritter von Speck (1888–1940), German Wehrmacht general
 Leslie Speck, American college football coach
 Mike Speck, American Gospel musician and ordained minister
 Oskar Speck (1907–1955), German canoeist and adventurer
 Richard Speck (1941–1991), American mass murderer
 Robert Speck (handball) (1909–?), Romanian field handball player
 Robert Speck (politician) (1915-1972), first and only mayor of the Town of Mississauga, Ontario
 Ross Speck (1927-2015), psychiatrist, psychoanalyst and family therapist
 Sam Speck, American politician
 Wieland Speck (born 1951), German film director
 Will Speck, American film director
 W. A. Speck (born 1938), British historian
 Zsa Zsa Speck (real name: Perry Pandrea), American keyboardist

Fictional characters:
 Tommy Speck, fictional character

See also 
 Hermann Speck von Sternburg (1852–1908), German diplomat and art collector
 Speck (disambiguation)

German-language surnames